Bernardus is a Latinized form of the Germanic name Bernard. It has been a given name in the Netherlands since the 17th century, though bearers tend to use a short form in daily life, like Barend, Ben, Ber, Berend, Bernard, Bert, and Bertus. People with this name include:

Latinized names
Bernardus Carnotensis (Bernard de Chartres; died c.1124), French Neo-Platonist philosopher, scholar, and administrator
Bernardus Claravallensis (Bernard de Clairvaux; 1090–1153), French abbot, Saint Bernard
Bernardus Ultrajectensis (Bernard van Utrecht), late 11th-century Dutch priest and writer
Bernardus Silvestris (Bernard Silvestre; fl. 1143–48)), French Platonist philosopher and poet
Bernardus Papiensis (Bernardo Balbi; bef.1150–1213), Italian canonist and bishop
Bernardus Compostellanus Antiquus (fl.1198–1200), Spanish jurist
Bernardus Compostellanus Junior, 13th-century Spanish priest and writer
Bernardus Parmensis (Bernardo di Botone; died 1266), Italian canonist
Bernardus de Trilia (Bernard de la Treille;c.1240–1292), French Dominican theologian and scholastic philosopher
Bernardus Guidonis (Bernard Gui; 1261–1331), French Dominican inquisitor and writer
Bernardus Trevisanus (Bernardo da Treviso; 1406–1490), Italian alchemist
Bernardus Oricellarius (Bernardo Rucellai;1448–1514), Florentine politician and humanist
Bernardus Clesius (Bernhard von Cles;1484–1539), Austrian cardinal, bishop, prince, diplomat, humanist and botanist
 (Berent ten Broecke; 1550–1633), Dutch scientist and physician
Given names
Bernardus Accama (1697–1756), Dutch historical and portrait painter
Bernardus Johannes Alfrink (1900–1987), Dutch Roman archbishop and cardinal 
Bernardus Antonie "Bernard" van Beek (1875–1941), Dutch landscape painter
Bernardus Johannes "Bernard" Blommers (1845–1914), Dutch etcher and painter
Bernardus P.J.N. "Bernard" Bolzano (1781–1841), Bohemian mathematician, logician, philosopher, and theologian 
Bernardus Joannes "Bertus" Caldenhove (1914–1983), Dutch footballer
Bernardus J.K. Cramer (1890–1978), Dutch architect
Bernardus Croon (1886–1960), Dutch rower
Bernardus Gerhardus "Brand" Fourie (1916–2008), South African ambassador to the United States
Bernardus "Ber" Groosjohan (1897–1971), Dutch footballer
Bernardus IJzerdraat (1891–1941), Dutch resistance fighter in the Second World War
Bernardus Petrus "Bernard" Leene (1903–1988), Dutch track cyclist and Resistance member
Bernardus C.J. "Bernard" Lievegoed (1905–1990), Dutch medical doctor, psychiatrist and author
Bernardus Marinus "Ben" Pon (born 1936), Dutch motor racing driver 
Bernardus van Schijndel (1647–1709), Dutch genre painter
Bernardus W.M. "Bert" van Sprang (1944–2015), Dutch astronomer
Bernardus D. H. "Bernard Tellegen (1900–1990), Dutch electrical engineer and inventor 
Bernardus J.M. "Ben" Verwaayen (born 1952), Dutch businessman
Bernardus J.M. "Ben" Zonneveld (born 1940), Dutch plant geneticist and botanist
Bernardus J.W. "Bernard" Zweers (1854–1924), Dutch composer and music teacher

See also
 3266 Bernardus, a minor planet named after Andres Bernardus Muller, Dutch astronomer

Dutch masculine given names
Latin masculine given names